Shin Myo Myat (c. 1490s – c. 1520s) was the mother of King Bayinnaung of Toungoo Dynasty of Burma (Myanmar), and the wet nurse of King Tabinshwehti. In 1516, she and her husband Mingyi Swe were hired to the household staff responsible for the royal infant Tabinshwehti. Although the Royal Chronicles proclaim her as a fifth generation descendant of King Thihathu of Pinya (r. 1310–1325) and his chief queen Mi Saw U of Pagan Dynasty, oral traditions insist that she and her husband were commoners from either Pagan (Bagan) or Toungoo (Taungoo) regions.

Despite Chronicles' posthumous proclamation of her royal descent, Myo Myat died in the 1520s as a royal servant and did not see her children enter the highest ranks of Toungoo royalty. Her eldest child Khin Hpone Soe became a principal queen of Tabinshwehti in 1530, and her second child Ye Htut (Bayinnaung) married the king's half-sister Princess Thakin Gyi in 1534. Her husband, who remarried after her death to her younger sister, became viceroy of Toungoo between 1540 and 1549. During Bayinnaung's reign, her other two sons became viceroys of Martaban (Mottama) and Prome (Pyay) with the respective styles of Minye Sithu and Thado Dhamma Yaza II in 1552, and her brother Sithu was appointed governor of Pagan (Bagan) in 1551.

References

Bibliography
 
 
 
 

Toungoo dynasty
Burmese royalty
Wet nurses
Deaths in childbirth